Gogebic may refer to:

Gogebic Community College in Ironwood, Michigan
Gogebic County, Michigan in the Upper Peninsula of Michigan
Gogebic Range, a mountainous area in the Upper Peninsula of Michigan
Gogebic Taconite, an iron-ore mining company
Lake Gogebic in the Upper Peninsula of Michigan
Lake Gogebic State Park in the Upper Peninsula of Michigan